Manuel Giandonato (born 10 October 1991) is an Italian footballer who plays as a midfielder for  club Fermana.

Club career

Juventus
Giandonato began his youth career with Juventus in 2004, and was promoted to the Primavera (Under 20) squad in 2009. After 7 years in the club's youth system, Giandonato began to earn senior call-ups during the 2009–10 Serie A season, and made his first Serie A appearance on 6 February 2010, coming on as an 83rd-minute substitute for club captain and icon, Alessandro Del Piero in a league match against Livorno. After making his first team debut, Giandonato helped the Primavera squad win their second consecutive Viareggio title in 2010. He made his first start for Juventus on 19 December 2010 against Chievo Verona, though he was sent off in the 52nd minute of the match for a professional foul. Giandonato scored a stunning free kick against Manchester United in Gary Neville's testimonial match.

On 30 August 2011, Giandonato joined U.S. Lecce on a season-long loan deal along with teammate Cristian Pasquato, in order to gain regular first-team experience. He made his debut with Lecce on 11 September 2011, starting in the 0–2 home loss against Udinese. On 30 June 2012, Giandonato returned to Juventus after making just 8 first team appearances for the Stadio Via del Mare outfit.

After taking part in much of Juventus' 2012–13 Serie A pre-season, Giandonato was loaned out to Serie B side, Vicenza Calcio on 27 August 2012 on another season-long loan operation. The loan deal, however, was cut short on 30 January 2013, when Juventus recalled the player in order to loan him out to fellow Serie B side, A.C. Cesena. Between the two clubs, Giandonato was a first team regular for much of the campaign, making 26 league appearances and scoring 1 goal.

Giandonato returned to Juventus on 30 June 2013, only to be released less than three months later.

Piacenza
On 16 July 2019, he signed with Piacenza.

Olbia
On 10 January 2020 he joined Olbia on loan. On 6 August 2020 he moved to Olbia on a permanent basis.

Fermana
On 19 August 2022, Giandonato returned to Fermana.

International career
Giandonato has represented Italy at the international level since 2006, when he began to earn call-ups for the U-16 squad. He has also been capped for the U-17, U-18, U-19 and U-20 teams. On 17 November 2010 he made his debut for the Italy U-21 team in a friendly game against Turkey. He has also been a member of the Italy under-21 Serie B representative team on 2 occasions, scoring a goal.

References

External links
 
 Profile on Italian FA website 
 

1991 births
Living people
Footballers from Abruzzo
Sportspeople from the Province of Chieti
Italian footballers
Association football midfielders
Serie A players
Serie B players
Serie C players
Juventus F.C. players
U.S. Lecce players
L.R. Vicenza players
A.C. Cesena players
Parma Calcio 1913 players
S.S. Juve Stabia players
U.S. Salernitana 1919 players
U.S. Catanzaro 1929 players
Calcio Padova players
S.S. Virtus Lanciano 1924 players
U.S. Livorno 1915 players
Fermana F.C. players
Piacenza Calcio 1919 players
Olbia Calcio 1905 players
Italy youth international footballers
Italy under-21 international footballers